Semomesia capanea is a species of butterfly of the family Riodinidae. It is found in South America.

Subspecies
Semomesia capanea capanea (Surinam, French Guiana, Brazil: Pará)
Semomesia capanea ionima Stichel, 1910 (Brazil: Amazonas)
Semomesia capanea sodalis Stichel, 1919 (Peru)

References

Butterflies described in 1779
Riodinidae
Lepidoptera of French Guiana
Riodinidae of South America
Taxa named by Pieter Cramer